Adolfo Millabur Ñancuil (born 30 August, 1966 in Tirúa, Arauco) is a Mapuche politician in Chile. Millabur served as Mayor of Tirúa from 1994 to 2011, holding the distinction of being the first Mapuche mayor in Chilean history.

Early life 
Millabur was raised in a family of eight brothers in El Malo, Biobío Region, located 35 kilometers from Tirúa. He stated that he would wake up at 5 AM every morning to walk 30 kilometers to school each day.

Career 
In 1992, Millabur was elected as a councillor in Tirúa. In 1996, he was elected to serve as Mayor of Tirúa, making him the first Mapuche mayor in Chilean history. 

Millabur participated in the formation of the Lafkenche Territorial Identity organization, a group dedicated defending Mapuche autonomy and the recovery and preservation of the nation's traditional lands.

In 2021, Millabur resigned as Mayor of Tirúa to run to represent the Mapuche in one of the seven seats reserved for the nation on the Constitutional Convention. He was elected alongside human rights attorney Natividad Llanquileo.

Personal life 
Millabur is married to Sandra Ibarra and has one living son. In March 2019, Millabur's son Licán Millabur was found dead at the age of 24 at his home near Lleulleu lake, with signs pointing to a possible suicide.

References 

Chilean people of Mapuche descent
Mapuche people
Chilean politicians
Mapuche politicians
Members of the Chilean Constitutional Convention
1966 births
Living people
20th-century Mapuche people
21st-century Mapuche people